Standings and results for Group 3 of the UEFA Euro 1996 qualifying tournament.

Standings

Results

Goalscorers

References

A. Yelagin - History of European Championships 1960-2000 (Terra-Sport, Moscow, 2002) - attendance information

Group 3
1994 in Swedish football
1995 in Swedish football
1994 in Icelandic football
1995 in Icelandic football
1994–95 in Swiss football
1995–96 in Swiss football
1994–95 in Turkish football
1995–96 in Turkish football
1994–95 in Hungarian football
1995–96 in Hungarian football
Switzerland at UEFA Euro 1996
Turkey at UEFA Euro 1996